Pas Tang (also Romanized as Pass Tang; also known as Pas Chāt) is a village in Susan-e Sharqi Rural District, Susan District, Izeh County, Khuzestan Province, Iran. At the 2006 census, its population was 131, in 24 families.

References 

Populated places in Izeh County